Mark Westley Williams (born July 28, 1953) is a former professional baseball outfielder. He played in three games for the Oakland Athletics of Major League Baseball in 1977, going 0-for-2 with 1 RBI.

Sources

Major League Baseball outfielders
Oakland Athletics players
Gulf Coast Royals players
Waterloo Royals players
Jacksonville Suns players
Omaha Royals players
San Jose Bees players
Chattanooga Lookouts players
Modesto A's players
San Jose Missions players
Baseball players from New York (state)
1953 births
Living people
Sportspeople from Elmira, New York